Naila Hassan is one of New Zealand's top-ranked police officers. She is now a Superintendent of New Zealand Police. She was promoted to the rank of inspector – one of the first Muslim women in New Zealand. However, it took her more than 20 years to tell anyone that she is a Muslim.

Early life  

Hassan has worked across numerous roles in her policing career, including Criminal Investigation Branch (CIB), prosecutions and as an area commander in the Waikato. She has been Area Commander since May 2015.

References 

Living people
Year of birth missing (living people)
New Zealand Commissioners of Police
New Zealand Muslims